Manketsi Mamoabi Emily Tlhape is a South African politician who has been an African National Congress (ANC) Member of the National Assembly of South Africa since 2019.

Political career
Tlhape had served as a Member of the Executive Council (MEC) in the North West provincial government. In December 2018, she was fired as an MEC by premier Job Mokgoro over reports that she stole cattle meant for emerging farmers.

Tlhape was elected to the National Assembly from the ANC's national list in the 2019 general election.

References

External links

Profile at Parliament of South Africa

Living people
Year of birth missing (living people)
Tswana people
Members of the North West Provincial Legislature
Women members of provincial legislatures of South Africa
Members of the National Assembly of South Africa
Women members of the National Assembly of South Africa